Battle of Italy may refer to:
The Italian campaign of the War of the Second Coalition in the French Revolutionary Wars, leading up to the Battle of Marengo
The Allied invasion of Italy in 1943 in World War II